Anna Stanislavovna Shcherbakova (born 28 March 2004) is a Russian figure skater. She is the 2022 Olympic champion, the 2021 World champion, a two-time European silver medalist (2020 and 2022), the 2019 Grand Prix Final silver medalist, the 2019 Skate America champion, the 2019 Cup of China champion, the 2021 Internationaux de France champion, the 2021 Gran Premio d'Italia champion, the 2019 CS Lombardia Trophy champion, and a three-time Russian national champion (2019–21). In her senior career, she has finished on the podium in every single competition she has entered.

At the junior level, Shcherbakova is the 2019 World Junior silver medalist, 2018 JGP Slovakia champion, 2018 JGP Canada champion, 2019 European Youth Olympic Winter Festival champion, and 2019 Russian junior national bronze medalist.

Shcherbakova is the first senior female skater to land a quad Lutz in competition and the first woman to land two quad Lutz jumps in a single program. She is also the first to land a quad flip in combination with a triple jump as well as the first woman to land two quad flip jumps in a single program.

Early life
Shcherbakova was born in Moscow on 28 March 2004 to parents Stanislav and Julia, a physicist and a geochemist. She has an older sister, Inna, and a younger sister, Yana. In 2007, at age three, Shcherbakova began learning to skate because her older sister was also a figure skater. Her first coach was Oksana Bulycheva at the Khrustalnyi rink of the Olympic Reserve Sports School No. 37 (later renamed "Sambo 70") in Moscow. She parted ways with Bulycheva in 2013 and began training in the most advanced group at the same rink, led by Eteri Tutberidze and Sergei Dudakov.

Career
In the summer of 2017, Shcherbakova broke her leg while performing a triple loop at a training camp. As a result, she missed most of the 2017–18 season, including her planned Junior Grand Prix debut. She returned to competition in January 2018 at the 2018 Russian Junior Championships, finishing thirteenth with a total score of 179.19. Then in February, she improved her total score by over 30 points at the 2017-18 Russian Cup Final to win the gold medal.

2018–2019 season: International debut
Shcherbakova debuted internationally on the Junior Grand Prix circuit in August. She was assigned to events in Slovakia and Canada. At JGP Slovakia, she placed first in both the short program and free skate, winning the gold medal by a margin of over 18 points over the silver medalist and fellow Russian competitor Anna Tarusina. At the time, her scores at the competition were the highest achieved in an international junior ladies competition. Her short program and combined total records were later surpassed by Alexandra Trusova, and the free program record was surpassed by Alena Kostornaia.

At JGP Canada, Shcherbakova once again placed first in both the short program and free skate and won the gold medal by a margin of five points over the silver medalist, Anastasia Tarakanova. With two gold medals on the Junior Grand Prix, she qualified for the 2018–19 Junior Grand Prix Final. At the final, Shcherbakova placed last in the short program and in the free skate, she placed fifth in the segment and overall.

At the 2019 Russian Championships, Shcherbakova placed fifth in the short program and first in the free skate, winning the national title over Alexandra Trusova by 0.07 points. She then competed at the 2019 Russian Junior National Championships. After placing second in the short program and third in the free skate, Shcherbakova won the bronze medal behind Trusova and Alena Kostornaia. She then competed at the 2019 European Youth Olympic Festival in Sarajevo and won the gold medal nearly thirty points ahead of silver medalist Lucrezia Beccari.

Shcherbakova was selected by the Russian Figure Skating Federation to compete at the 2019 Junior World Championships in Zagreb, Croatia, alongside Trusova and Kostornaia (later replaced by Ksenia Sinitsyna). She placed first in the short program after receiving a score of 72.86. In the free skate, she landed her quad Lutz jump with a minor error in landing position, receiving a negative grade of execution. Her score of 147.08 was the highest she had ever attained at an international competition but was not enough to overtake Trusova, who had landed two quad jumps in the free program. Shcherbakova won the silver medal.

2019–2020 season: Senior international debut

In September, Shcherbakova entered her first international senior competition in Italy at the ISU Challenger Series event, the 2019 Lombardia Trophy. After the short program, she was in third place behind Elizaveta Tuktamysheva and You Young. In the free program, she became the first senior woman to land a quad Lutz in senior competition, ensuring the gold medal in her senior debut. Her free program featured a costume change when the music switches from Gnossiennes No. 1 to The Firebird.

Shcherbakova made her ISU Grand Prix debut at the 2019 Skate America, where she won the gold medal after placing fourth in the short program and first in the free skate. At the competition, she became the first woman to land two quadruple Lutz jumps in the free skate in an international competition and the first woman to land a quadruple Lutz-triple jump combination in an international competition. In the free skate, she became the second lady after Alexandra Trusova to achieve a score above 160 points under the current GOE system when she scored her personal best score of 160.16 points, only three points short of Trusova's world record. Shcherbakova also set new records for the highest valued single jump, earning 14.79 points for her quadruple Lutz, and for the highest valued jump combinations, when she earned 18.66 points for her quad Lutz-triple toe loop combination. Shcherbakova also won her second event, the 2019 Cup of China, by a 14.86-point margin and qualified for the Grand Prix Final in Torino. 

At the Grand Prix Final, Shcherbakova placed third in the short program behind teammates Alena Kostornaia and Alina Zagitova. In the free skate, she landed two quad Lutzes (one deemed underrotated) and attempted for the first time, but fell on, the quad flip. She nevertheless placed first in the free skate and won the silver medal behind Kostornaia. Then at the 2020 Russian Championships, she skated cleanly to place second in the short program behind Kostornaia, who was ten points ahead going into the free skate. Shcherbakova won the free skate, landing two quad Lutzes and the quad flip for the first time, and won her second national title by just under two points overall.

Shcherbakova competed at the 2020 European Championships, delivering a clean short program skate to place second. In the free skate, Shcherbakova landed the quad Lutz-triple toe loop combination to start, followed by a quad flip. However, she fell on the second quad Lutz. Despite the fall, she placed first in the free skate and won the silver medal behind Kostornaia. Together with Kostornaia and Trusova, who took the bronze, the trio made for an all-Russian podium in the ladies' singles event. They were assigned to compete at the World Championships in Montreal, but the event was cancelled due to the COVID-19 pandemic.

2020–2021 season: World champion
Shcherbakova debuted both of her programs at the Russian senior test skates with only one fall on her quad Lutz attempt in the free program, which she called "a good starting point". Due to the COVID-19 pandemic and the lack of international competitions, all Russian skaters were required to compete in the 2020–21 Russian Cup series in order to qualify for the 2021 Russian Championships. Shcherbakova won the first stage in Syzran with a score of 246.40 and the third stage in Sochi with 239.91 points. She was assigned, as with other prominent Russian skaters, to the 2020 Rostelecom Cup after the ISU decided to base the Grand Prix primarily on geographic location due to the COVID-19 pandemic. However, she withdrew on the day of the event due to illness, later revealed to be pneumonia.

Shcherbakova had limited ability to train in advance of the 2021 Russian Championships due to pneumonia. She decided to compete in the event against her coaches' recommendation for her to withdraw. She won the short program with a score of 80.31 despite competing with a 100-degree fever. In the free skate, she landed both a quad Lutz and quad flip and won the segment with a score of 183.79, with Kamila Valieva as the silver medalist and Alexandra Trusova taking the bronze medal. Shcherbakova became the first woman to win three consecutive Russian titles since Irina Slutskaya from 1999 to 2001. Shcherbakova was assigned to the Russian team for the 2021 World Championships in Stockholm. Prior to the World Championships, she participated in the televised 2021 Channel One Trophy as part of the Red Machine team captained by Alina Zagitova. She placed second in both segments of the competition, and the Red Machine won the trophy. She opted not to participate in the Russian Cup Final in order to rest before the World Championships. 

In the short program at the World Championships, Shcherbakova skated a personal best in the short program, scoring 81.00 to place first ahead of Rika Kihira. She then placed second in the free program with a score of 152.17 points in spite of falling on one of her quad jumps, within one point of Trusova's 152.38 points. Overall, Shcherbakova won the competition to become the World champion. Shcherbakova, Elizaveta Tuktamysheva and Trusova's podium placements made this only the second time, after the United States in 1991, that a single country had swept the ladies' podium at the World Championships. Shcherbakova then competed as part of the Russian team for the 2021 World Team Trophy in April, winning the short program on the opening day within one point ahead of Tuktamysheva. Shcherbakova finished in first place and won a gold medal with team Russia.

2021–2022 season: Olympic champion 
Shcherbakova began her Olympic season in October at the 2021 Budapest Trophy. She led after the short program, but was later overtaken in the free skate by training-mate Maiia Khromykh after falling on her opening quad flip. She placed second in the free skate to finish narrowly behind Khromykh and take the silver medal overall. Her first Grand Prix assignment was initially the 2021 Cup of China, but following its cancellation she was reassigned to the 2021 Gran Premio d'Italia in Turin. After an error on her jump combination in the short program, she placed third in that segment behind Belgium's Loena Hendrickx and Khromykh. She came back in the free skate and landed a quad flip to win both that segment and the gold medal. Shcherbakova went on to win her second event, the 2021 Internationaux de France, defeating Alena Kostornaia by almost eight points. These results qualified her for the Grand Prix Final, which was subsequently canceled due to restrictions prompted by the Omicron variant.

At the 2022 Russian Championships, Shcherbakova placed second in the short program behind Kamila Valieva. She fell on her only quad attempt in the free skate, placing fourth in that segment, but took the bronze medal overall behind Valieva and Alexandra Trusova. However, in 2023, Valieva was stripped of the Russian title due to testing positive for the banned substance trimetazidine, so Shcherbakova became the silver medalist. At the 2022 European Championships in Tallinn, Shcherbakova placed fourth in the short program after falling on her triple Lutz and failing to execute a jump combination. Mounting a comeback in the free skate with a quad flip and seven triple jumps, she placed second in the segment and took the silver medal behind Valieva.

On 20 January, Shcherbakova was officially named to the Russian Olympic team. She was not considered the favorite to win the gold medal in the women's event after losing to Valieva at both the Russian and European Championships. She was not selected to compete in the team event as Valieva competed in both segments. In the short program of the women's event, she skated cleanly and placed second in the short program with a score of 80.20, 1.94 points behind segment leader Valieva and 0.36 points ahead of third-place Kaori Sakamoto. In the free skate, Shcherbakova skated cleanly once again, scoring 175.75, 1.38 points behind segment leader Trusova. After gold medal favorite and leader after the short program Valieva fell multiple times in the free skate, Shcherbakova won the event with an overall score of 255.95. After winning the gold medal, Shcherbakova indicated that she wanted to continue competing including at the upcoming World Championships.

In early March 2022, the ISU banned all figure skaters and officials from Russia and Belarus from attending the World Championships due to the Russian invasion of Ukraine, therefore Shcherbakova was not allowed to participate and defend her title. Instead, Russia organized the Channel One Trophy to occur during the World Championships. Shcherbakova was named the captain of the Red Machine team. The first day of the competition was a jumping competition, and Shcherbakova led her team to victory. In the short program, she scored 82.90 and placed second behind Kamila Valieva. Then in the free skate, she scored 176.12 and finished first overall, and the Red Machine team won the competition.

2022–2023 season: Injury 
In August 2022, Shcherbakova traveled to Germany in order to have knee surgery for an injury she sustained prior to the Olympics. She did not recover from the surgery in time for the 2023 Russian Championships. 

In 18 March 2023, Shcherbakova performed at the show program tournament "Russian Challenge" in Moscow. She presented a program to the music from the TV series "17 Moments of Spring" and finished third in the competition with a score of 19.08.

Skating technique
Shcherbakova's skating has been distinguished by her high consistency in the performance of her programs. Her performances and technique are also highlighted by her ability to consistently land the quad Lutz and quad flip. Her quad jumping ability is often compared to those of her teammates Kamila Valieva and Alexandra Trusova. Because she performs fewer quad jumps than Valieva and Trusova, Shcherbakova relies on her consistency and artistry. She is known for her musicality and dramatic performances.

Public image and endorsements
Shcherbakova appeared on the March 2020 cover of the Russian edition of Tatler alongside teammates Alina Zagitova, Alexandra Trusova, and Alena Kostornaia. In March 2020, Shcherbakova became a Nike ambassador. In November 2021, she was featured in a commercial for Sberbank. In May 2022, she became an ambassador of the Chery Omoda 5. Shcherbakova collaborated with Chinese company Geetaverse to release a collection of NFTs titled "Born to Skate".

In October 2022, Shcherbakova joined fellow Olympic champions Alexei Yagudin and Alina Zagitova as a host of the ninth season of Ice Age on Channel One Russia.

Records and achievements
 Set the junior-level ladies' record for the combined total (205.39 points), short program (73.18 points) and free program (132.21 points) at the 2018 JGP Slovakia. Her free program record was broken by Russian teammate Alena Kostornaia at the 2018 JGP Austria on 1 September 2018 with 132.42 points. Her short program record was broken by Russian teammate Alexandra Trusova at the 2018 JGP Lithuania on 6 September 2018 with 74.74 points.
 First female skater to land a quad Lutz on 6 October 2018 at the 2nd stage of the 2018 Russian Cup.
 Second senior female skater after Elizabet Tursynbaeva to land a quad jump internationally at the 2019 CS Lombardia Trophy.
 First senior female skater to land a quad Lutz in international competition on 14 September 2019 at the 2019 CS Lombardia Trophy. 
 First female skater to land two quad Lutz jumps in one program in ISU sanctioned international competition at the 2019 Skate America. At this competition, she also became the first lady to land a quad Lutz and a triple jump combination in an international competition.
 Set the new record for the highest valued single jump when she earned 14.79 points for her quadruple Lutz at the 2019 Skate America. At this competition, she also set the new record for the highest valued jump combination when she earned 18.66 points for her 4Lz+3T combination. This was later broken by Alexandra Trusova when she earned 14.95 points for her quadruple Lutz at the 2019 Rostelecom Cup. 
 First senior female skater to land two quad flip jumps in one program at the 2022 Winter Olympics. At this competition, she also became the first lady to land a quad flip and a triple jump combination in competition.
 First Olympic champion in women’s single skating with quad jumps.

Awards 
 Master of Sports of Russia (2018) 
 Master of Sport of Russia International Class (2020) 
 Honored Master of Sports of Russia (2021) 
 Russian Order of Friendship (2022) 
 Certificates of Merit by The Moscow City Duma (2022) 
 "Pride of Russia" National Sports Award (2022) 
 Best athlete of the Olympic Games in Tokyo and Beijing (2022)   
 Nominated by ISU as the Most Valuable Skater (2023)

Programs

Competitive highlights
GP: Grand Prix; CS: Challenger Series; JGP: Junior Grand Prix

Detailed results

Senior level

Small medals for short and free programs awarded only at ISU Championships. Personal bests highlighted in bold.

Junior level

 
Small medals for short and free programs awarded only at ISU Championships. Previous ISU world best highlighted in bold.

References

External links

 

! colspan="3" style="border-top: 5px solid #78FF78;" |World Record Holders

! colspan="3" style="border-top: 5px solid #78FF78;" |World Junior Record Holders

2004 births
Living people
Russian female single skaters
World Figure Skating Championships medalists
World Junior Figure Skating Championships medalists
European Figure Skating Championships medalists
Figure skaters from Moscow
Figure skaters at the 2022 Winter Olympics
Olympic figure skaters of Russia
Medalists at the 2022 Winter Olympics
Olympic medalists in figure skating
Olympic gold medalists for the Russian Olympic Committee athletes